Pope Honorius II (r. 1124–1130) created 27 cardinals in six consistories held throughout his pontificate. This included his successors Anastasius IV and Celestine II both in 1127.

1124
 Guido

1125
 Gregorio
 Uberto Ratta
 Alberico Tomacelli
 Rodolfo degli Armanni della Staffa
 Stefano
 Ugo Geremei
 Cosma
 Pietro dei Garsendi

1126
 Mathieu O.S.B. Clun.
 Giovanni O.S.B. Clun.
 Sigizzo Bianchelli iuniore
 Gregorio
 Matteo
 Anselmo Can. Reg.
 Pierre
 Gian Roberto Capizucchi

1127
 Bennone de' Cocliti
 Guido di Castello
 Pierre

1128
 Joselmo
 Rustico
 Rustico de' Rustici

1129
 Errico
 Gerardo
 Matteo

Notes and references

Sources

College of Cardinals
Honorius II
12th-century cardinals
12th-century Catholicism